HeroQuest II: Legacy of Sorasil is an isometric role-playing game that was released on Amiga 1200 and CD32 in 1994 by Gremlin Interactive. The game is the sequel to the 1991 video game HeroQuest, both inspired by the adventure board game Hero Quest from Milton Bradley.

Gameplay
There are 9 large missions to take on. The players can choose a team of 4 from 8 character classes. The abilities of these can be customized before the game starts. The game is controlled using action icons at the bottom of the screen to set the basic instructions to move, fight, open doors, search for treasure or hidden doors and traps.

Reception

The game received generally positive reviews.

The One gave HeroQuest II an overall score of 74%, calling it "the same old Hero Quest with slightly flashier graphics and a different plot. ... [HeroQuest II] comes across as being just a little half-hearted." Despite this, The One goes on to state that "there's a fair degree of enjoyment to be had. There's a well-crafted learning curve", and praised the game's "intuitive" UI, but remarking that the game overall feels dated.

References

External links
 
 Legacy of Sorasil entry at The Hall of Light: The Database of Amiga Games

1994 video games
Amiga games
Amiga 1200 games
Amiga CD32 games
Fantasy video games
Gremlin Interactive games
Multiplayer and single-player video games
Role-playing video games
Video games based on board games
Amiga-only games
Video games developed in the United Kingdom